Vladyslav Ruslanovych Molko (born 19 October 2002) is a Ukrainian professional footballer who plays as a defensive midfielder for Ukrainian club Kremin Kremenchuk.

References

External links
 
 

2002 births
Living people
People from Kremenchuk
Ukrainian footballers
Association football midfielders
FC Kremin Kremenchuk players
Ukrainian First League players
Ukrainian Amateur Football Championship players
Sportspeople from Poltava Oblast
21st-century Ukrainian people